As the use of letters increased in popularity, guides began to emerge on how to correctly write and form a letter and as to what was proper, and what was not. Many of these Victorian conventions are a way of understanding tensions in nineteenth-century England, such as the urge to speak from the heart, but never more than was proper.

Physical concerns
A letter’s physical appearance, in addition to its content, was a concern for letter-writing guides. For men, guides advocated plain paper and for women, a light spritz of perfume was sometimes acceptable. Other sources, however, disagreed and suggested high outward ornamentation such as ribbons, flowery drawings, and interesting colors could be used by females, but part of this may have been the date of the guide, as vogue changed by the decade. Earlier in the century, ribbons were popular, but fashion changed to heavy cream paper in the 1880s and then monogrammed letterheads by the end of the nineteenth century. The manner of sealing the letter also changed over the years. Originally it had been wax wafers and dried gum, but as time went on colored wax became more prevalent, the use of which was dictated by social conventions. Black wax was always associated with mourning, but red wax was to be used in letters between men, particularly those dealing with business, and letters from men to women. Women were free to use a range of colors, no matter the correspondent.

Ink was debated; though all sides agreed on bold black ink, blue was sometimes suggested as an alternative, and all other colors shunned, though most letter-writing guides acknowledged that they had once been in fashion.

Contradictions
Letter writing guides advised writing with absolute feeling and being cautious about saying too much. They also warned against saying the wrong things, regardless of whether or not these wrong things had real feelings behind them. Many guides cautioned that anyone could read a letter and thereby make inferences about its author, even if those corresponded with assured that they burnt the letters after reading them.

Matrimonial letters
The caution about appearance in letters was stressed in matrimonial letters, even as women and men were encouraged to still write from the heart. Men were warned against complimenting their chosen bride too heavily, as it seemed insincere; rather, their moral traits and the feminine virtue of indifference were set as prime subjects to appreciate in a marriage proposal. Women, meanwhile, were urged not to be too unguarded in their letters, even in the acceptance of a proposal, to only thank and address the man’s moral qualities. Love letters did not end in ‘love,’ but more frequently simply as ‘ever your friend’.

Example letters

The value of letters 
Aside from their use as a means of correspondence, letters can be seen as a form of a representation of people’s lived experiences during different historical eras. Such information can be gleaned from letters public and private.

Believing that letters are valuable historical documents, James Willis Westlake, who was a public school teacher born just before the Victorian era in England in 1830, had moved to America at a young age where he published his book on the subject. Westlake says letters are valuable in acquiring knowledge of past people and events. He believes they are important in gaining insight into the moral lives of great people after which one’s behavior could be modeled. Westlake also claimed that the use of letters of well-written and eloquent individuals can be adapted to improve letter-writing style.

In the New London Fashionable Gentleman’s Writer, is an example of the usage of letter writing as a collection of quaint correspondences between hopeful men and the ladies they wished to court. Such a manual may have been used by anxious men as they prepared to write to their love interests and express their feelings, and perhaps by women as they decided how best to accept or reject the advances.

Some prominent figures turned to letter writing as a creative outlet. Emily Dickinson used her letters to push back against the constraints which women, herself included, faced during the era. Letter-writing was one of the few literary pursuits in which women were allowed to participate, and Dickinson used this to her advantage, infusing traditional letter-writing with her own artistic flair in order to develop her skills as a writer. George Howell, an amateur Victorian artist, used his letters to his brother as a space to combine his words and his artistic works. Similarly, Beatrix Potter, an author/illustrator, often included pictures in her letters as a means of comfort and relief from the pressures she faced from her family.

Children were taught the art of letter-writing, as well; they were particularly taught to form letters neatly with instructive books filled with drawing and line instruction. One of these such books, “Elementary Drawing Copy Books,” incorporated traditional alphabet practice with instructions on drawing elements of the natural world. In addition to proper handwriting, young boys and girls were taught to compose letters for different reasons. Girls’ writing books taught them to use their writing skills for household management tasks, while those for boys taught proper forms for business correspondence.

Footnotes

References
 Jacques, D.H.. How To Write. New York City, New York: Fowler and Wells, 1857. Print.
 Anonymous. The American Letter-Writer, and Mirror of Perfect Politness. Boston: G.W. Cottrell, 1851. Print.
 Frost, Annie S. Frost's Original Letter Writer. New York: Dick and Fitzgerald, 1867. Print.

External links

Eras of Elegance: Letter Writing Guide
Victoriana: Love Letters
A very Victorian guide to letter writing
How to Write Letters: A Manual of Correspondence

Letters (message)
Letter Writing
Style guides